

References

Madeiran society